Zameioscirpus is a genus of flowering plants belonging to the family Cyperaceae.

Its native range is Western Peru to Western Argentina.

Species:
 Zameioscirpus atacamensis (Phil.) Dhooge & Goetgh. 
 Zameioscirpus gaimardioides (É.Desv.) Dhooge & Goetgh. 
 Zameioscirpus muticus Dhooge & Goetgh.

References

Cyperaceae
Cyperaceae genera
Plants described in 2003
Flora of South America